"The Sash" (also known as "The Sash My Father Wore") is a ballad from the Irish province of Ulster commemorating the victory of King William III in the Williamite War in Ireland in 1690–1691. The lyrics mention the 1689 Siege of Derry, the 1689 Battle of Newtownbutler near Enniskillen, the 1691 Battle of Aughrim, and the 1690 Battle of the Boyne. It is popular amongst Ulster loyalists and many other unionists in Northern Ireland, as well as in parts of Scotland.

The melody has been traced back to the early 19th century.  The tune of "The Sash" was well-known around Europe, and before the lyrics were added, it was a love song that lamented division between people. Instead of "it was old and it was beautiful", the lyrics were "she was young and she was beautiful" and is in Broadside Ballads (1787), titled "Irish Molly O". Another known printing of the tune is from 1876 including the words "The Hat My Father Wore". The song is classified in the Roud Folk Song Index as number 4796.  It has also been adapted by fans of Stockport County F.C., who call it "The Scarf My Father Wore" or simply "The Anthem".

Lyrics

Sheet music

Footnotes

External links
Video of a man playing The Sash on a fife- from YouTube
Broadside Ballads

Football songs and chants
Northern Irish songs
Orange Order
Rangers F.C. songs
Year of song unknown